Real ID may refer to:

 Real ID (Battle.net), a system of using real names with Battle.net accounts
 REAL ID Act, an Act of the United States Congress